The Alexander Organ House is a historic residence located in Maquoketa, Iowa, United States.  It is one of several Victorian houses in Maquoketa that are noteworthy for their quoined corners, a rare architectural feature in Iowa.  Built around 1896, the 2-story brick house follows an L-shaped plan.  It features a 1-story wing in the back, quoining with cream colored brick, limestone foundation, gable roof, a polygonal bay window on the east elevation, and a bracketed canopied porch with cresting on the main facade.  Organ worked as a clothing merchant. This house was one of many houses built during Maquoketa's economic expansion in the late 19th century.  It was listed on the National Register of Historic Places in 1991.

References

Houses completed in 1896
Victorian architecture in Iowa
Houses in Maquoketa, Iowa
National Register of Historic Places in Jackson County, Iowa
Houses on the National Register of Historic Places in Iowa
1896 establishments in Iowa